Mycosphaerella stigmina-platani is a fungal plant pathogen.

See also
 List of Mycosphaerella species

References

Fungal plant pathogens and diseases
stigmina-platani
Fungi described in 1938